The 5th district of the Iowa Senate is located in Northwestern Iowa. It is currently composed of Calhoun, Humboldt, Pocahontas and Webster counties.

Current elected officials
Tim Kraayenbrink is the senator currently representing the 5th District.

The area of the 5th District contains two Iowa House of Representatives districts:
The 9th District (represented by Ann Meyer)
The 10th District (represented by Mike Sexton)

The district is also located in Iowa's 4th congressional district, which is represented by U.S. Representative Randy Feenstra.

Past senators
The district has previously been represented by:

Henry H. Trimble, 1856–1859
William E. Taylor, 1860–1861
E. F. Esteb, 1862–1863
Ziba Brown, 1864–1865
Edward E. Edwards, 1866–1867
James D. Wright, 1868–1869
Edward M. Bill, 1870–1871
Martin Read, 1872–1873
Lloyd Selby, 1874–1875
Henry L. Dashiell, 1876–1877
Samuel L. Bestow, 1878–1879
William M. Wilson, 1880–1883
John McDonough, 1884–1887
J. B. Harsh, 1888–1895
George S. Allyn, 1896–1903
Marion F. Stookey, 1904–1908
John D. Brown, 1909–1912
Charles H. Thomas, 1913–1916
James A. Stephenson, 1917–1920
J. A. McIntosh, 1921–1924
H. Guy Roberts, 1925–1928
Frank D. Ickis, 1929–1932
Frank M. Stevens, 1933–1936
Howard W. Edwards, 1937–1940
S. Ray Emerson, 1941–1944
R.B. Hawkins, 1945–1948
X. T. Prentis, 1949–1962
Franklin S. Main, 1963–1964
James E. Briles, 1965–1970
Vernon H. Kyhl, 1971–1972
Ray Taylor, 1973–1982
Arne F. Waldstein, 1983–1986
Linn Fuhrman, 1987–1993
Mary Lou Freeman, 1994–2002
Stewart Iverson, 2003–2006
Rich Olive, 2007–2010
Robert Bacon, 2011–2012
Daryl Beall, 2013–2015
Tim Kraayenbrink, 2015–present

See also
Iowa General Assembly
Iowa Senate

References

05